The Marshall Islands marked its second consecutive Olympiad, at the 2012 Summer Olympics in London, from July 27  to August 12, 2012. The Olympian delegation included two men and two women, one male and one female athlete in athletics (track and field) and one male and one female athlete in swimming. Middle-distance runner Haley Nemra was honored as the national flag bearer at the opening ceremony. The Marshall Islands continued their streak of bringing home no medals.

History 
The Marshall Islands debuted at the 2008  in Beijing, China, with a five Olympian delegation. The athletes prepared for the London Games at a month long training camp in Australia. 

The Marshall Islands created its National Olympic Committee in 2001, and gained International Olympic Committee (IOC) recognition in 2006 during the IOC's meeting on February 9, 2006 in Turin, Italy. The addition of the Marshall Islands along with Montenegro and Tuvalu the following year brought the total number of nations competing at the 2008 Summer Olympics to 205.

Athletics

The Marshall Islands were represented by one male and one female athlete at the 2012 Summer Olympics in athletics: Timi Garstang and Haley Nemra. This was the first Olympic appearance for Garstang and the second for Nemra. Nemra previously competed in the women's 800 meter at the 2008 Summer Olympics in Beijing. Namara was also the flag bearer for these Olympic Games.

Timi Garstang competed in the men's 100 meter, where he finished last out of seven athletes in his heat. The medals for the event went to athletes from Jamaica and the United States.

Haley Nemara participated in the women's 800 meter, where she came sixth out of seven athletes in her heat. The medals in the discipline went to athletes from Russia and South Africa.

Note–Ranks given for track events are within the athlete's heat only

Men

Women

Swimming 
The Marshall Islands were represented by one male and one female athlete at the 2012 Summer Olympics in swimming: Giordan Harris and Ann-Marie Hepler. This was the first Olympic appearance for both Harris and Hepler.

Giordan Harris competed in the men's 50 meter freestyle, where he finished sixth in his heat and placed forty-sixth in the standings. The medals in the event went to athletes from France, the United States, and Brazil.

Ann-Marie Hepler partook in the women's 50 meter freestyle, where she placed third in her heat and ranked forty-ninth in the standings. The medals in the event went to athletes from the Netherlands, and Belarus.

References

Nations at the 2012 Summer Olympics
2012
Oly